Vijaya High School is a co-educational school in Jayanagar 3rd block, Bangalore, Karnataka. The school received 27 ranks in the Karnataka State Board Exam for SSLC (10th) exam conducted in 1998, the highest ranking of any public school.

Amenities
The school features an auditorium, sports facilities, and AV theater and various clubs.

Educational sections
The high school comprises seven sections from section A to section G.

Kannada medium: Section A.

English medium with Kannada as First language: Section B & C.

English medium with Samskruta as First language: Sections D to Section G.

Educational institutions established in 2002
High schools and secondary schools in Bangalore
2002 establishments in Karnataka